Volga-Vyatka economic region (tr.: Volgo-Vyatsky ekonomichesky rayon) is one of twelve economic regions of Russia. It accounted for almost 3 per cent of the national GRP in 2008. All of it is in the Volga Federal District

Composition
Chuvash Republic
Kirov Oblast
Mari El Republic
Republic of Mordovia
Nizhny Novgorod Oblast

References

Economic regions of Russia